Przewalski's steppe lemming (Eolagurus przewalskii) is a species of rodent in the family Cricetidae.
It is found in China and Mongolia.

References

 Baillie, J. (1996).  Eolagurus przewalskii.   2006 IUCN Red List of Threatened Species.   Downloaded on 19 July 2007.
Musser, G. G. and M. D. Carleton. (2005). Superfamily Muroidea. pp. 894–1531 in Mammal Species of the World a Taxonomic and Geographic Reference. D. E. Wilson and D. M. Reeder eds. Johns Hopkins University Press, Baltimore.

Eolagurus
Rodents of China
Mammals of Mongolia
Mammals described in 1889
Taxa named by Eugen Büchner
Taxonomy articles created by Polbot